This is a list of songs recorded by Northern Irish rock band Therapy?.

Rare released songs 
The following is a table of rare released songs meeting the following criteria:

 Songs on any official record release (record company or otherwise), and any collaborations by Therapy? with other artists, are included here, except for songs on the official 15 albums (Baby Teeth to Cleave), the 2 compilation albums (So Much for the Ten Year Plan and Music Through a Cheap Transistor), the 2 live albums (We're Here to the End and Communion: Live at the Union Chapel), or The Gemil Box.
 Songs provided on the official website for free download are not included here.
 Songs only released on bootlegs are not included here.
The columns Title, Released, Where and Notes list each song title, the year the song was released, on which release it can be found and any notes accompanying the song.

Official website free MP3 downloads 

The following is a table of Official Website Free MP3 Downloads meeting the following criteria;

 Songs released exclusively free via the official website (or mailing list) and unavailable elsewhere are included here.
 Songs on any official release are not included here.
The columns Title, Recorded, Source, MP3 kbit/s and Notes list each song title, the year the song was recorded, the audio source, the bit-rate of the download and any notes accompanying the song.

Rare unreleased songs 

The following is a table of rare non-released songs meeting the following criteria:

 Noteworthy songs released on bootlegs are included here.
 Noteworthy songs not available yet in any form are included here.
 Noteworthy songs released via streaming (not download) on official sites are included here.
 Songs on any official release are not included here.
The columns Title, Recorded, Source, Available and Notes list each song title, the year the song was recorded, the audio source, the availability of the song and any notes accompanying the song.

Unofficial bootleg releases 

"Have a Merry Fucking Christmas" (7")
"Next to You / Invisible Sun" (7", turquoise)
"Live at the Astoria" (12") (London '92)
"I Want My Money Back" (London '92)
"Who Did This?" (Berlin '93)
"No Love Lost" (Hultsfred '93, Roskilde '93, Feile '93, Aalborg '92)
"Fistful of Power" (Donington '94)
"Isolation" (Wolverhampton '94)
"Absolutely Barking" (Donington '94, London '94)
"Clash Therapy" (Stockholm '94)
"Not Lunacy" (Stockholm '94)
"Shock Treatment" (Florence '94)
"Iron Man" (Florence '94)
"Europe 1994" (Donington '94, Glasgow '94, London '94)
"Live in England 94" (Donington '94, London '92)
"Good Fuckin' Night" (Glasgow '94)
"Dead Laughing" (Arnhem '95)
"The Black Sessions" (Paris '95)
"Infernal Gum" (B-Sides)

External links 
 Official website
 Official discography

Therapy